Makalata is a genus of rodents in the family Echimyidae.

Systematics
The etymology of this genus name derives from a combination of letters inspired by the Suriname native name Maka-alata for spiny rats.

This genus contains the following species:
 Brazilian spiny tree-rat (Makalata didelphoides)
 Long-tailed armored tree-rat (Makalata macrura)
 Dusky spiny tree-rat (Makalata obscura)
 Peruvian tree-rat (Makalata rhipidura)

Phylogeny
Makalata is the sister genus to Echimys and Phyllomys. These taxa are closely related to the genera Pattonomys and Toromys, reflecting the fact Pattonomys occasius and Toromys grandis have been placed in Makalata by some authorities. In turn, these five genera share phylogenetic affinities with a clade containing the bamboo rats Dactylomys, Olallamys, Kannabateomys together with Diplomys and Santamartamys.

References

 
Rodent genera
Taxonomy articles created by Polbot